National Immunization Technical Advisory Group (NITAG) is an advisory committee consisting of multidisciplinary groups of experts responsible for providing information to national governments that is used to make evidence-based decisions regarding vaccine and immunization policy. The majority of industrialized and some developing countries have formally established advisory committees to guide immunization policies; other countries are working towards establishment of such committees.

Purpose
The primary purpose of NITAG is to provide technical resources, supplying guidance and recommendations to national policy makers and programme managers to enable them to make evidence-based immunization related policy and program decisions. This may also include vaccination schedules regarding appropriate timing, dosage, and contraindications of vaccines. To ensure that the government gives proper attention to NITAG recommendations, NITAG usually report to high level officials of the Ministry of Health.

In immunization related policy, Strategic Advisory Group of Experts on Immunization (SAGE) have established mechanisms to synthesize evidence and make global recommendations. Such recommendations will be further interpreted at the country level by NITAGs. As they need to take account of factors such as local disease epidemiology, acceptability of vaccination strategies to local populations, equity in local populations, and programmatic and financial constraints.

In 2011, the World Health Organization (WHO) recommended that NITAG be established in each member country. The Global Vaccine Action Plan (GVAP) requested all 194 members countries to establish, or have access to, a NITAG by 2020.

NITAG are considered to be functional when they meet six defined process indicators agreed upon by the WHO, which are:
 having a legislative or administrative basis,
 having formal terms of reference,
 having at least five areas of expertise represented among its membership,
 having at least one meeting per year,
 distribution of the agenda and background documents at least one week prior to meetings, and
 having mandatory disclosure of conflict of interests.

As of 2021, there are 172 countries reporting existence of NITAG and 121 countries with NITAG with all six WHO functionality criteria. And 85% of the world’s population is served by such NITAGs, 52% increase compared to 2010.

Members
There are no fixed rules about the total number of NITAG members as it depends on local considerations such as the need for geographic representation, the size of the country, and the availability of resources. However, experience has shown that successful NITAG function with about 10–15 members. NITAG members typically consist of multidisciplinary experts and represent a broad range of skills and expertise from the following disciplines/areas: clinical medicine (paediatrics and adolescent medicine, adult medicine, geriatrics), epidemiologists, infectious diseases specialists, microbiologists, public health, immunology, vaccinology, immunization programme, health systems and delivery, clinical research and health economics.

List of NITAG
There are no specific guideline on naming of NITAG. Therefore, NITAG in each country may have different names, for example:

 Australia: Australian Technical Advisory Group on Immunisation (ATAGI)
 Canada: National Advisory Committee on Immunization (NACI)
 France: Technical Committee of Vaccination ( / CTV)
 Germany: Standing Committee on Vaccination ( / STIKO)
 India: National Technical Advisory Group on Immunisation (NTAGI)
 Ireland: National Immunisation Advisory Committee (NIAC)
 United Kingdom: Joint Committee on Vaccination and Immunisation (JCVI)
 United States: Advisory Committee on Immunization Practices (ACIP)

References

External links
 NITAG Resource Center page

Vaccination-related organizations